John Wetenhall (1669-1717)  was Archdeacon of Cork  from 1697 until his death.

The son of Edward Wetenhall, Bishop of Cork & Ross, he  was born in Devon and educated at Trinity College, Cambridge. He held the living at Moviddy and was also a prebendary of Ross Cathedral.

References

Alumni of Trinity College, Cambridge
1669 births
1717 deaths
Archdeacons of Cork
Clergy from Devon
17th-century Irish Anglican priests
18th-century Irish Anglican priests